Jane Osborn Hannah ( – ) was an American opera singer.  After retiring, she was active in the women's suffrage movement. 

A lyric soprano, her teachers included Vittorio Carpi, Johanna Hess-Burr, Mathilde Marchesi, and Rosa Sucher. She debuted in Leipzig in 1904 as Elisabeth in Tannhäuser. She appeared as Eva in Die Meistersinger von Nürnberg at Covent Garden in 1908. In 1910 she debuted at both the Metropolitan Opera as Elizabeth in Tannhäuser and the Chicago Opera Company as Nedda in Pagliacci. Other notable roles included Elsa in Lohengrin, Sieglinde in Die Walküre, Gutrune in Götterdämmerung, Desdemona, the title character in Madama Butterfly, and Barbara in Victor Herbert’s Natoma.

Hannah retired from music in 1914.  In retirement, she performed for a number of suffragist conferences and other events.  In 1919, she joined a suffragist protest in front of the White House and another at the Metropolitan Opera. 

Hannah died on August 13, 1943 in New York City.

Personal life 
On November 25, 1907, she married Frank S. Hannah.  He died in March 1934.

References 

Created via preloaddraft
1873 births
1943 deaths
People from Wilmington, Ohio
Singers from Ohio
Classical musicians from Ohio
American operatic sopranos
20th-century American women opera singers